Linton is a village and civil parish in Herefordshire, England, approximately  east of Ross-on-Wye.

The village church of St Mary's dates to the 13th century. Amenities include a post office, which opens a few hours each week, and a village hall which provides activities such as Brownies and pilates.

Each year the only pub in the village, The Alma Inn, hosts a live music blues event in its beer garden. The event provides funds for local charities and good causes.

References

External links 

Villages in Herefordshire